Decommunization in former communist states is the process of purging former communist high officials and eliminating communist symbols. 

It is sometimes referred to as political cleansing. Although the term has been occasionally used during the Cold War, it is most commonly applied to the former countries of the Eastern Bloc and the Soviet Union to describe a number of legal and social changes during their periods of postcommunism during the post–Cold War era.

In some states, decommunization includes bans on communist symbols. While sharing common traits, the processes of decommunization have run differently in different states.

Responsible institutions
 Czechia – The Office of the Documentation and the Investigation of the Crimes of Communism
 Slovakia – The Institute of National Memory – Ústav pamäti národa (Sk)
 Estonia – The Estonian International Commission for Investigation of Crimes Against Humanity
 Germany – The Federal Commissioner for the Stasi Records (BStU)
 Hungary – The Committee of National Remembrance
 Lithuania – The Lithuanian Center for the Research of Genocide and Resistance
 Poland – The Institute of National Remembrance — Commission for the Prosecution of Crimes against the Polish Nation
 Romania – The Institute for the Investigation of Communist Crimes in Romania
 Moldova – The Commission for the Study of the Communist Dictatorship in Moldova
 Ukraine – The Ukrainian Institute of National Remembrance

Purging and prosecution of former communist officials
Decommunization came to refer to government policies of limiting the participation of former communist officials in politics. This should not be confused with lustration which is the procedure of scrutinizing holders or candidates for public offices in terms being former  informants of the communist secret police.

According to a 1992 constitutional amendment in the Czech Republic, a person who publicly denies, puts in doubt, approves, or tries to justify Nazi or Communist genocide or other crimes of Nazis or Communists will be punished with a prison term of six months to three years. In 1992, Barbara Harff wrote that no Communist country or governing body had been convicted of genocide. In his 1999 foreword to The Black Book of Communism, Martin Malia wrote: "Throughout the former Communist world, moreover, virtually none of its responsible officials has been put on trial or punished. Indeed, everywhere Communist parties, though usually under new names, compete in politics."

In August 2007, Arnold Meri, an Estonian Red Army veteran and cousin of former Estonian president Lennart Meri, faced charges of genocide by Estonian authorities for participating in the deportations of Estonians in Hiiumaa during 1949. Meri denied the accusation, characterizing them as politically motivated defamation, stating: "I do not consider myself guilty of genocide." The trial was halted when Meri died on 27 March 2009 at the age of 89.

State leaders
 Afghanistan – Mohammad Najibullah was never convicted of a crime, but was nonetheless tortured and executed by the Taliban in 1996.
 Bulgaria – Todor Zhivkov was initially sentenced to seven years in prison, but transferred to house arrest due to health reasons. He was later declared innocent by the Supreme Court of Bulgaria in 1996 and was released from house arrest shortly thereafter. He died as a free man one year later.
 Cambodia – Kang Kek Iew is so far the only indicted Khmer Rouge leader, despite him having died convicted in 2020, while Pol Pot and others lived free without charges.
 East Germany – Erich Honecker was arrested, but soon released and the proceedings against him were abandoned due to his ill health. He died in 1994. Several other members of the former East German government, such as Egon Krenz, were nonetheless convicted.
 Poland – Wojciech Jaruzelski avoided most court appearances, citing poor health, and was never convicted. He died as a free man in 2014 and was buried with full military honors at the Powązki Military Cemetery, attended by the incumbent president of Poland, as well as two former presidents.
 Romania – Nicolae Ceaușescu and his wife, Elena Ceaușescu were sentenced to death and executed by firing squad.

Elimination of communist symbols

Ukraine 

The process of decommunization and de-Sovietization in Ukraine started soon after dissolution of the Soviet Union in the early 1990s, led by President Leonid Kravchuk, a former high-ranking party official. In April 2015, a formal decommunization process started in Ukraine after laws were approved which outlawed communist symbols, among other things. On 15 May 2015, President Petro Poroshenko signed a set of laws that started a six-month period for the removal of communist monuments (excluding World War II monuments) and renaming of public places named after communist-related themes. At the time, this meant that 22 cities and 44 villages would need to be renamed. In 2016, 51,493 streets and 987 cities and villages were renamed, and 1,320 Lenin monuments and 1,069 monuments to other communist figures were removed.

Poland 
Since 1989, Poland has taken down hundreds of Soviet monuments due to the negative reputation the Soviet Union has in Poland. Although some Poles see the memorials as justified in honouring those who died fighting against Nazi Germany, others seek the removal of Soviet memorials because of the decades of totalitarianism that resulted from Soviet occupation, and also because of the 1939 Nazi-Soviet pact and the Katyn massacre. Historian Lukasz Kaminski of the Institute of National Remembrance said, "Memorials in city centers and villages can send the wrong historical signal... What do you think we got, when the Soviets liberated Poland from Hitler, if not a new yoke?"

In the 2010s, Poland continued to demolish remaining Soviet monuments, some of which have been relocated to museums. The removals have attracted criticism from Russian Foreign Minister Sergey Lavrov, who has lashed out at Warsaw officials for opposing the monuments, as has Maria Zakharova, a spokesperson for the Russian foreign ministry.

Czech Republic 
In April 2020, a statue of Soviet Marshal Ivan Konev was removed from Prague, which prompted criminal investigation by Russian authorities who considered it an insult. The Mayor of Prague's sixth municipal district, Ondřej Kolář, announced on Prima televize that he would be under police protection after a Russian man made attempts on his life. Prime Minister Andrej Babiš condemned that as foreign interference, while Kremlin Press Secretary Dmitry Peskov dismissed allegations of Russian involvement as "another hoax".

Results
Communist parties outside of Poland and the Baltic states were not outlawed and their members were not prosecuted. Just a few places attempted to exclude even members of communist secret services from decision-making. In a number of countries, the communist party simply changed its name and continued to function.

Stephen Holmes of the University of Chicago argued in 1996 that after a period of active decommunization, it was met with a near-universal failure. After the introduction of lustration, demand for scapegoats has become relatively low, and former communists have been elected for high governmental and other administrative positions. Holmes notes that the only real exception was former East Germany, where thousands of former Stasi informers have been fired from public positions.

Holmes suggests the following reasons for the turnoff of decommunization:
After 45–70 years of Communist state rule, nearly every family has members associated with the state. After the initial desire "to root out the reds" came a realization that massive punishment is wrong and finding only some guilty is hardly justice.
The urgency of the current economic problems of postcommunism makes the crimes of the communist past "old news" for many citizens.
Decommunization is believed to be a power game of elites.
The difficulty of dislodging the social elite makes it require a totalitarian state to disenfranchise the "enemies of the people" quickly and efficiently and a desire for normalcy overcomes the desire for punitive justice.
Very few people have a perfectly clean slate and so are available to fill the positions that require significant expertise.

Similar concepts 
Decommunization has been compared to denazification in post-World War II Europe, and the de-Ba'athification in post-Saddam Hussein Iraq.

See also
Anti-communism
Communist crimes in Polish legal system
Decommunization in Russia
Decommunization in Ukraine
Denazification
De-Ba'athification
De-Stalinization
Derussification
Golaniad
Lustration in Poland
Proclamation of Timișoara
Street name controversy
Vergangenheitsbewältigung
Estonian International Commission for Investigation of Crimes Against Humanity
Bans on communist symbols
Demolition of monuments to Vladimir Lenin in Ukraine

References

 
 
Political repression